In 1891, the Macon and Northern Railroad was established and took over the failed Covington and Macon Railroad. It operated  of track between Macon and Athens, Georgia, USA. The M&N Railroad went bankrupt in 1894 and was then reorganized as the Macon and Northern Railway, which was then purchased by the Central of Georgia Railroad in 1895.

References

Defunct Georgia (U.S. state) railroads
Railway companies established in 1894
Railway companies disestablished in 1895
Predecessors of the Central of Georgia Railway